Bradford Township is the name of some places in the U.S. state of Pennsylvania:
Bradford Township, Clearfield County, Pennsylvania
Bradford Township, McKean County, Pennsylvania

See also 
 East Bradford Township, Chester County, Pennsylvania
 West Bradford Township, Chester County, Pennsylvania

Pennsylvania township disambiguation pages